Beatriz "Betty" Kretschmer Ries de Buccicardi (born 24 January 1928) is a Chilean sprinter. She competed in the heats only at the 1948 Summer Olympics, running in the women's 100 metres, 200 metres and relay.

She was the long jump gold medallist and 4 × 100 metres relay silver medallist at the 1951 Pan American Games and returned four years later to win a further bronze medal with the Chilean relay team. She also placed fourth in the 200 m at the 1951 Games.

At regional level she had a long-lasting career. Her first medals were two silvers in the 100 m and 200 m at the 1943 South American Championships in Athletics. She gained her first South American title at the 1945 Championships, taking 100 m gold in addition to a 200 m silver. A triple followed at the 1946 South American Championships, where she topped the field in 100 m, 200 m and the long jump. Her last successes were at the 1956 South American Championships in Athletics, where she was 200 m champion and 100 m runner-up.

References

1928 births
Living people
Place of birth missing (living people)
Chilean female sprinters
Chilean female long jumpers
Olympic athletes of Chile
Athletes (track and field) at the 1948 Summer Olympics
Pan American Games gold medalists for Chile
Pan American Games medalists in athletics (track and field)
Athletes (track and field) at the 1951 Pan American Games
Athletes (track and field) at the 1955 Pan American Games
Medalists at the 1951 Pan American Games
Medalists at the 1955 Pan American Games
20th-century Chilean women